Steven George Andrascik (born November 6, 1948) is a Canadian retired professional ice hockey right winger who played one game in the National Hockey League (NHL) for the New York Rangers.

Playing career
Andrascik was born in Sherridon, Manitoba. He was drafted by the Detroit Red Wings of the National Hockey League (NHL) in the 1968 NHL Amateur Draft in the first round, eleventh overall. On November 1, 1970, the Red Wings traded Andrascik to the New York Rangers for Don Luce. After five years in the Central Hockey League and American Hockey League, Andrascik made it to the NHL for one game in the 1971–72 playoffs for the Rangers; he recorded no points and no penalty minutes.

About a year after playing his single NHL game, the Rangers traded him to the Pittsburgh Penguins. Instead of joining Pittsburgh, he joined the Indianapolis Racers of the World Hockey Association (WHA) for the 1974–75 season. Only 20 games into the season, he, along with Steve Richardson, were traded to the Michigan Stags for Jacques Locas and Brian McDonald. In the 1975–76 season, Andrascik played for yet another WHA team, the Cincinnati Stingers.

In total, Andrascik played one NHL game and 97 WHA games, scoring 9 goals, 13 assists and 22 points.

See also
List of players who played only one game in the NHL

External links

1948 births
Baltimore Blades players
Canadian ice hockey right wingers
Cincinnati Stingers players
Detroit Red Wings draft picks
Flin Flon Bombers players
Fort Worth Wings players
Greensboro Generals (SHL) players
Hampton Gulls (SHL) players
Hershey Bears players
Ice hockey people from Manitoba
Indianapolis Racers players
Living people
Michigan Stags players
National Hockey League first-round draft picks
New York Rangers players
Omaha Knights (CHL) players
People from Northern Region, Manitoba
Providence Reds players